Theodore Frederick Atkinson (June 17, 1916 – May 5, 2005) was a Canadian-born American thoroughbred horse racing jockey, inducted into the National Museum of Racing and Hall of Fame in 1957.

Born in Toronto, Ontario, Canada. His sister was Ruth Atkinson Ford. Ted Atkinson as a child emigrated with his family across the border to upstate New York.  He began his career in thoroughbred horse racing in 1938 and first gained national recognition in 1941, when he rode War Relic to an upset win in the Narragansett Special over the 1941 U.S. Triple Crown winner Whirlaway. For 12 of his 21 years in the sport, Atkinson was contract rider for the wealthy New York City Whitney family's Greentree Stable. In 1944, he was North America's leading jockey in both number of wins and money earned. He repeated the feat in 1946, when he became the first rider to achieve purse earnings of more the $1 million in a single season.

Riding Greentree's colt Capot, Atkinson just missed winning the U.S. triple Crown in 1949 when he finished second in the Kentucky Derby then won both the Preakness and the Belmont Stakes. Capot shared Horse of the Year honors with Coaltown, after beating the older horse in the Pimlico Special. Atkinson was also the jockey for all of Hall of Famer Tom Fool's races, guiding the colt to a perfect season of 10 wins in 10 starts, including the New York Handicap Triple and winning the Horse of the Year honors in 1953.

In 1957, Ted Atkinson was voted the George Woolf Memorial Jockey Award and that same year became the first active jockey elected to the National Museum of Racing and Hall of Fame. He was then invited to appear on the CBS television's The Ed Sullivan Show. In an article on jockey Eddie Arcaro, TIME magazine wrote that: "He [Arcaro] also gives a large share of credit to gentlemanly Jockey Ted Atkinson, who helped raise the standard of sportsmanship on New York tracks." 

Following his retirement in 1959 as a result of a back injury, Atkinson became a racing official and served as State Steward in Illinois from 1961 until 1976.

Atkinson, who had been fighting a lengthy cancer-related illness, died at his home near Beaverdam, Virginia after several strokes, a few weeks short of his 89th birthday.

References

 Ted Atkinson at the Canadian Horse Racing Hall of Fame
 Ted Atkinson at the National Museum of Racing and Hall of Fame
 National Museum of Racing and Hall of Fame: "Hall Of Famer Ted Atkinson Dies at Age 88"

1916 births
2005 deaths
American jockeys
American Champion jockeys
American color commentators
Canadian emigrants to the United States
Canadian Horse Racing Hall of Fame inductees
Sportspeople from New York (state)
Sportspeople from Toronto
People from Old Toronto
People from Hanover County, Virginia
United States Thoroughbred Racing Hall of Fame inductees